"Near the Cross", alternatively titled "Jesus, Keep Me Near the Cross" or "In the Cross", is a Christian hymn written by Fanny Crosby and published in 1869.

Composition
The tune was composed by William Howard Doane before Crosby wrote the lyrics. The song is in F major and  time. It remains one of Crosby's best-known hymns and has been translated into several languages, including German, Russian, Haitian Creole, and Spanish.

Lyrics
Jesus, keep me near the cross;
There a precious fountain,
Free to all, a healing stream,
Flows from Calvary's mountain.

Refrain:
In the cross, in the cross, 
Be my glory ever,
Till my raptured soul shall find
Rest beyond the river.

Near the cross, a trembling soul,
Love and mercy found me,
There the Bright and Morning Star
Shed its beams around me.

Near the cross! O Lamb of God, 
Brings its scenes before me;
Help me walk from day to day,
With its shadows o'er me.

Near the cross I'll watch and wait,
Hoping, trusting ever, 
Till I reach the golden strand
Just beyond the river.

See also
List of works by Fanny Crosby

References

Hymns by Fanny Crosby
Songs with lyrics by Fanny Crosby
1869 songs
1869 in Christianity
Songs about Jesus